Shangdi Subdistrict is a subdistrict situated in the northeast of Haidian District, Beijing, China. It shares border with Xibeiwan Town in its north, Qinghe Subdistrict in its east, Qinglongqiao Subdistrict in its south, and Malianwa Subdistrict in its west. In the year 2020, Its population was 67,139.

The subdistrict was created in 2000. Its name Shangdi is referring to its elevated landscape compared to its surrounding area.

Administrative Divisions 
As of 2021, Shangdi Subdistrict administered the following 13 communities within its border:

See also 

 List of township-level divisions of Beijing

References 

Subdistricts of Beijing
Haidian District